Sant Feliu de Codines is a municipality in the comarca of Vallès Oriental, Catalonia, Spain. It is located in the north-west corner of the comarca, on the border with comarca of Moianès to the north, and the comarca of Vallès Occidental to the west.

History 
The name of Sant Feliu first appears in 1059, when the nobleman Mir Geribert and his wife Guisla were named Barons of Montbui by the Count of Barcelona Ramon Berenguer I the Old. These were the first feudal lords, who occupied a barony that extended the length and breadth of an extensive region which includes the present-day municipalities of Sant Feliu, Bigues i Riells, l'Ametlla del Vallès and Santa Eulàlia de Ronçana.

Over the centuries, Sant Feliu became the most prominent part of the barony, when measured both in number of inhabitants and in artisanal production. This caused the inhabitants of Sant Feliu to consider independence from the barony of Montbui. After many petitions, and taking advantage of a favourable political situation, in 1793 King Charles IV granted the parish of Sant Feliu de Codines the title of Vila, effective December 8, 1799.

The population grew around the parish church, where the Sagrera neighbourhood was formed (meaning "sacred land"). Currently, this area still retains narrow alleys and some buildings typical of past centuries. Slowly the town grew and other important neighbourhoods of the town center were formed, such as the Serrat de Vic and the Venderia or Revenderia.

Over time an intense rivalry was created between the two neighbourhoods, to the point that the Venderia, in 1796, built its own bell tower. Since this time, the rivalry between the two neighbourhoods disappeared, and other neighbourhoods and residential areas were also formed until the current village of Sant Feliu de Codines was formed.

The almost exclusive dry climate that Sant Feliu enjoys, its natural environment and the proximity to large cities are the main factors that converted it into a new bedroom community by the late nineteenth century.

Illustrious people 
People born in Sant Feliu include: Sebastià Farnés i Badó; Joan Petit i Aguilar; Josep Mumbrú i Vernet of Casa Mumbrú (lo Vendrell); Josep Umbert i Rosàs; Josep Umbert i Ventura, creator of the Roca Umbert Factory; Andreu Codina i Candelas; Josep Parés i Casals; Laia Berenguer i Puget; Agustí Serratacó i Costa, Pere Pladevall i Vallcorba; Nicolau Usart i Furriol; Manel Vila i Valls; Josep Cassart i Valldeoriola; Dionisio Escorsa i Cruells; and Nuria Berengueras i Costa.

An illustrious character who visited the town was Antoni Gaudí. In Sant Feliu, he left his mark on the design of the banner of the local Orfeó Feliuà, which is on displayto the Can Xifreda Municipal Museum. Dr. Bartomeu Robert also enjoyed the good climate of Sant Feliu, to the point that he commented that Sant Feliu was the best town in Vallès and recommended to many of his patients to spend long periods to cure their illnesses.

Among other illustrious visitors we must also highlight the passage of the philologist Pompeu Fabra. He spent the summer in Can Viladomat, from where he went into exile on January 24, 1939, due to the Spanish Civil War. In 2016, these events were commemorated by placing a plaque in the house of Can Viladomat, on Agustí Santacruz Street, and with a lecture by the linguist Jordi Mir.

We must also highlight the passage of politicians Manuel Carrasco i Formiguera (whose name was bestowed on the secondary school of the municipality), Francesc Cambó, and the theologian and philosopher Jaume Balmes (whose name was bestowed on the primary school). Balmes who notably wrote El Criterio in the nearby masia of Prat de Dalt, in Caldes de Montbui.

Demography

Entities 

 ADF El Pinyó
 Agrupació Sardanista de Sant Feliu de Codines
 Agrupament Escolta Makalu
 Amics del Ball
 Amics del Museu de Sant Feliu de Codines
 Anandaya
 Assemblea Territori SFIndependència
 Asociación Alianza La Paz
 Associació Contra el Càncer - Junta Local
 Associació Cultural i Gastronòmica Sense Estovalles
 Associació Cultural No m'Atabalis
 Associació d'arts i oficis Sant Feliu
 Associació d'empresaris de Sant Feliu de Codines
 Associació de Consum el Cogombre a l'ombra
 Associació de Defensa pels Animals
 Associació de Jubilats i Pensionistes de Sant Feliu de Codines
 Associació de Música i Arts de Sant Feliu de Codines
 Associació de Sevillanes de Sant Feliu
 Associació de Veïns Racó del Bosc
 Associació de Veïns Carrer de Montbui
 Associació Fira del Rellotge
 Associació Gastronòmica Els Poca Gana
 Associació Guifinet
 Associació Mans Unides
 Associació Sant Feliu en Sac
 Associació Vincles, espai de criança
 Atthenew SFC
 Càritas
 Casal Cultural Codinenc
 Centre Excursionista de Sant Feliu de Codines
 Club Atlètic Atlètic Sant Feliu
 Club Billar Sant Feliu
 Club de Bàsquet Sant Feliu
 Club de Petanca La Fonteta de Sant Feliu
 Club de Tennis Sant Feliu
 Club Escacs - El Peó Codinenc
 Club Esportiu Racó del Bosc
 Club Futbol Sant Feliu
 Club Hoquei Sant Feliu
 Club Tennis Taula
 Colla Boines Negres
 Comunitat Makinera Sant Feliu
 Country
 Creu Roja
 El magatzem solidari
 Esbart Codinenc
 Escuderia Vall del Tenes-Sant Feliu
 Fundació patronat Agustí Santacruz
 Geganters de Sant Feliu
 Gremi de Sant Antoni Abat
 Grup de Comerciants Codinencs
 Grup de teatre Blaugrana Scena
 Grup de teatre Deixalles 81
 Grup del Correfoc del Follet i la Fantasma
 KulActiu, entitat juvenil de Sant Feliu
 La Caldera, associació de músics de Sant Feliu
 Moto Club Cingles de Bertí
 Mots pel Vint-i-u
 Ona Codinenca, la ràdio municipal
 Òmnium Cultural Vallès Nord - Cingles de Bertí (Vallès Oriental)
 Penya barcelonista "Els Blaugrana"
 Rotary Club Cingles de Bertí
 Secció Ciclista del Club d'Hoquei Sant Feliu
 Secció de Patinatge del Club d'Hoquei
 Sents Veus
 Societat Coral La Poncella
 Societat de Caçadors
 Voluntaris forestals SFC

References 

 Panareda Clopés, Josep Maria; Rios Calvet, Jaume; Rabella Vives, Josep Maria (1989). Guia de Catalunya, Barcelona: Caixa de Catalunya.  (Spanish).  (Catalan).

External links 
 Official site 
 Government data pages 
 Information from the Diputació de Barcelona 

Municipalities in Vallès Oriental